Cat is a nickname, often a short form (hypocorism) of  Catherine or Katherine. It may refer to:

Women
 Cat Cora (born 1968), American chef
 Cat Deeley (born 1976), English television presenter, actress, singer and model
 Cat Glover (born 1968), American choreographer, dancer and singer
 Catriona Gray (born 1994), Filipino-Australian beauty pageant titleholder who won Miss Universe 2018
 Cat Hulbert (1950-2022), American professional gambler
 Cat Osterman (born 1983), American former collegiate softball pitcher
 Cat Smith (born 1985), English politician
 Catriona Sparks (born 1965), Australian science fiction writer, editor and publisher
 Cat Whitehill (born 1982), American soccer player and coach
 Cat Zingano (born 1982), American mixed martial arts fighter

Men
 Cat Anderson (1916–1981), American jazz trumpeter
 Ellis Clary (1916–2000), American Major League Baseball player, coach and scout
 Cat Doucet (1899–1975), American politician and sheriff

Hypocorisms
Lists of people by nickname